Giovanni Dwight Calderón (born February 8, 2002) is a Puerto Rican international footballer who plays as a defender who plays for Hartford Athletic in the USL Championship.

Career

Club 
On May 10, 2021, Calderón joined USL Championship side Hartford Athletic on a USL Academy contract, which means he also maintains his eligibility to play college soccer.

International 
Calderón made his debut for the Puerto Rico national team on September 6, 2019 in a friendly vs. Honduras.

Personal
Giovanni is the son of Edgar Calderón and Marilyn Calderón. He is brother of fellow footballer Joshua Calderón.

Career statistics

International

References

External links
 Development Academy profile

2002 births
Living people
Soccer players from Connecticut
People from North Haven, Connecticut
Puerto Rican footballers
Association football defenders
Puerto Rico international footballers
Hartford Athletic players
Sportspeople from New Haven County, Connecticut